Qoph  (Phoenician Qōp ) is the nineteenth letter of the Semitic scripts. Aramaic Qop  is derived from the Phoenician letter, and derivations from Aramaic include   Hebrew Qof , Syriac Qōp̄  ܩ and Arabic  .

Its original sound value was a West Semitic emphatic stop, presumably . In Hebrew numerals, it has the numerical value of 100.

Origins

The origin of the glyph shape of qōp is uncertain. It is usually suggested to have originally depicted either a sewing needle, specifically the eye of a needle (Hebrew  quf and Aramaic  qopɑʔ both refer to the eye of a needle), or the back of a head and neck (qāf in Arabic meant "nape").
According to an older suggestion, it may also have been a picture of a monkey and its tail (the Hebrew  means "monkey").

Besides Aramaic Qop, which gave rise to the letter in the Semitic abjads used in classical antiquity, 
Phoenician  qōp is also the origin of the Latin letter Q and Greek Ϙ (qoppa) and Φ (phi).

Hebrew Qof
The English spellings of Biblical names (as derived from Latin via Biblical Greek) containing this letter may represent it as c or k, e.g. Cain for Hebrew Qayin, or Kenan for Qena'an (Genesis 4:1, 5:9).

Pronunciation
In modern Israeli Hebrew the letter is also called . The letter represents ; i.e., no distinction is made between the pronunciations of Qof and Kaph (in modern Hebrew).

Qoph is consistently transliterated into classical Greek with the unaspirated〈κ〉/k/, while Kaph (both its allophones) is transliterated with the aspirated〈χ〉/kʰ/. Thus Qoph was unaspirated /k/ where Kaph was /kʰ/, this distinction is no longer present. Further we know that Qoph is one of the emphatic consonants through comparison with other Semitic languages, and most likely was ejective /kʼ/. In Arabic the emphatics are pharyngealised and this causes a preference for back vowels, this is not shown in Hebrew orthography. Though the gutturals show a preference for certain vowels, Hebrew emphatics do not in Tiberian Hebrew (the Hebrew dialect recorded with vowels) and therefore were most likely not pharyngealised, but ejective,  pharyngealisation being a result of Arabisation.

Numeral
Qof in Hebrew numerals represents the number 100.

Arabic Qāf

The Arabic letter  is named  . It is written in several ways depending in its position in the word:

Traditionally in the scripts of the Maghreb it is written with a single dot, similarly to how the letter fā ف is written in Mashreqi scripts:

It is usually transliterated into Latin script as q, though some scholarly works use ḳ.

Pronunciation
According to Sibawayh, author of the first book on Arabic grammar, the letter is pronounced voiced (maǧhūr), although some scholars argue, that Sibawayh's term maǧhūr implies lack of aspiration rather than voice. As noted above, Modern Standard Arabic has the voiceless uvular plosive  as its standard pronunciation of the letter, but dialectical pronunciations vary as follows:

The three main pronunciations:

: in most of Tunisia, Algeria and Morocco, Southern and Western Yemen and parts of Oman, Northern Iraq, parts of the Levant (especially the Alawite and Druze dialects). In fact, it is so characteristic of the Alawites and the Druze that Levantines invented a verb "yqaqi" /jqæqi/ that means "speaking with a /q/". However, most other dialects of Arabic will use this pronunciation in learned words that are borrowed from Standard Arabic into the respective dialect or when Arabs speak Modern Standard Arabic.
: in most of the Arabian Peninsula, Northern and Eastern Yemen and parts of Oman, Southern Iraq, some parts within Jordan, eastern Syria and southern Palestine, Upper Egypt (Ṣaʿīd), Sudan, Libya, Mauritania and to lesser extent in some parts of Tunisia, Algeria, and Morocco but it is also used partially across those countries in some words.
: in most of the Levant and Egypt, as well as some North African towns such as Tlemcen and Fez.

Other pronunciations:

: In Sudanese and some forms of Yemeni, even in loanwords from Modern Standard Arabic or when speaking Modern Standard Arabic.
: In rural Palestinian it is often pronounced as a voiceless velar plosive , even in loanwords from Modern Standard Arabic or when speaking Modern Standard Arabic.

Marginal pronunciations:

: Optionally in Iraqi and in Gulf Arabic, it is sometimes pronounced as a voiced postalveolar affricate , even in loanwords from Modern Standard Arabic or when speaking Modern Standard Arabic.
 ~ : in Sudanese and some Yemeni dialects (Yafi'i), and sometimes in Gulf Arabic by Persian influence, even in loanwords from Modern Standard Arabic or when speaking Modern Standard Arabic.

Velar Gāf

Maghrebi variant

The Maghrebi style of writing  is different: having only a single point (dot) above; when the letter is isolated or word-final, it may sometimes become unpointed.

The earliest Arabic manuscripts show  in several variants: pointed (above or below) or unpointed.

Within Maghribi texts, there is no possibility of confusing it with the letter , as it is instead written with a dot underneath in the Maghribi script.

Unicode

References

External links

Arabic letters
Hebrew letters
Phoenician alphabet